Hartmut Michel (born 18 July 1948) is a German biochemist, who received the 1988 Nobel Prize in Chemistry for determination of the first crystal structure of an integral membrane protein, a membrane-bound complex of proteins and co-factors that is essential to photosynthesis.

Education and early life
He was born on 18 July 1948 in Ludwigsburg. After compulsory military service, he studied biochemistry at the University of Tübingen, working for his final year at Dieter Oesterhelt's laboratory on ATPase activity of halobacteria.

Career and research
Hartmut later worked on the crystallisation of membrane proteins - essential for their structure elucidation by X-ray crystallography. He received the Nobel Prize jointly with Johann Deisenhofer and Robert Huber in 1988. Together with Michel and Huber, Deisenhofer determined the three-dimensional structure of a protein complex found in certain photosynthetic bacteria. This membrane protein complex, called a photosynthetic reaction center, was known to play a crucial role in initiating a simple type of photosynthesis. Between 1982 and 1985, the three scientists used X-ray crystallography to determine the exact arrangement of the more than 10,000 atoms that make up the protein complex. Their research increased the general understanding of the mechanisms of photosynthesis, revealed similarities between the photosynthetic processes of plants and bacteria and established a methodology for crystallising membrane proteins.

Since 1987 he has been director of the Molecular Membrane Biology department at
the Max Planck Institute for Biophysics in Frankfurt am Main, Germany, and professor of biochemistry at the Goethe University Frankfurt.

Awards and honours
In 1986, he received the Gottfried Wilhelm Leibniz Prize of the Deutsche Forschungsgemeinschaft, which is the highest honour awarded in German research. In 1988, he received the Nobel Prize in Chemistry. He received the Bijvoet Medal at the Bijvoet Center for Biomolecular Research of Utrecht University in 1989. In 1995 he became a member of the German Academy of Sciences Leopoldina. He also became a foreign member of the Royal Netherlands Academy of Arts and Sciences in 1995. He was elected a Foreign Member of the Royal Society (ForMemRS) in 2005.

References

External links
 

1948 births
Members of the European Molecular Biology Organization
Foreign associates of the National Academy of Sciences
Living people
German biochemists
Nobel laureates in Chemistry
German Nobel laureates
Gottfried Wilhelm Leibniz Prize winners
Foreign Members of the Royal Society
Foreign members of the Chinese Academy of Sciences
Members of the Royal Netherlands Academy of Arts and Sciences
Max Planck Society people
Commanders Crosses of the Order of Merit of the Federal Republic of Germany
Recipients of the Order of Merit of Baden-Württemberg
Academic staff of Goethe University Frankfurt
Scientists from Frankfurt
Researchers of photosynthesis
Bijvoet Medal recipients
Members of the German Academy of Sciences Leopoldina
University of Tübingen alumni
Max Planck Institute directors